Jessen (Elster) station is a railway station in the municipality of Jessen (Elster), located in the Wittenberg district in Saxony-Anhalt, Germany.

References

Railway stations in Saxony-Anhalt
Buildings and structures in Wittenberg (district)